is a party video game developed by Hudson Soft and published by Nintendo for the GameCube. It is the fifth installment in the Mario Party series and the second game in the series to be released for the GameCube. It was first released in North America and Japan in November 2003, followed by Europe a month later. The game is set in the fictional Dream Depot, consisting of seven game boards. The single-player "Story" mode involves the player winning multiple games against the Koopa Kids to prevent Bowser from conquering the Dream Depot. The main multiplayer game mode consists of four characters from the Mario series playing a board game, with each board having a set theme. The game also features several minigames, which are played after every set of turns. Mario Party 5 introduces the "Super Duel" mode to the franchise, which requires players to assemble and control custom made battle vehicles which can be used in combat against other machines. The game features ten playable characters, with playable debuts to the series from Toad, Boo, and Koopa Kid.

Mario Party 5 received "average" reviews by the media; reviewers enjoyed the new minigames of the series, although a perceived lack of originality was criticized. The game became part of the Nintendo Player's Choice label in 2004, and won the Console Children's Award at the 2004 Interactive Achievement Awards. It was followed by Mario Party 6 in 2004.

Gameplay

Mario Party 5 retains the fundamental gameplay featured in previous installments, which is based upon a themed board game played by characters of the Mario series. The player's objective is to obtain the most stars by the end of the board game, which are purchased for twenty coins when passing the designated star space on the game board. There are 77 minigames, through which most coins are earned. A randomly-chosen minigame is played after all players have rolled the die. "Party Mode" is the main multiplayer mode, and involves four characters competing in a standard board game either independently or in opposing pairs. As with its predecessors, players can adjust the number of turns in a game by multiples of 5 up to 50 and determine the difficulty of artificial intelligence opponents, among others.

Mario Party 5 features ten playable characters, including three additional characters to the series: Toad, Boo, and Koopa Kid. Hudson omitted Donkey Kong as a playable character from the series in this installment, instead featuring him in the "DK space", which initiates an event granting the possibility of a star or coins whenever landed on. Like previous installments, blue and red spaces add or deduct 3 coins from players when they land on them. "Bowser spaces" return from Mario Party 4. While the series' predecessors used item shops as a means to obtain items, Mario Party 5 introduces the capsule system. Capsules are containers that hold a single item which are acquired when passing the "Capsule Machine" on the board. The items contained within them serve a variety of purposes, from increasing the range of the Dice Block and thus movement, to deducting ten coins from an opponent. The capsules can only be thrown up to ten spaces ahead of the current position. During a game, the gameplay is altered for the last five turns with the options selected randomly via a roulette wheel; such changes include tripling the coin benefit or deficit from coloured spaces.

The game's boards incorporate the theme of the Dream Depot, with each having "Dream" at the end of the board's title, except for the "Bowser's Nightmare" board. Themes of the boards include dreams of toys and treasure hunting, among others. Each board consists of multiple types of spaces, some of which grant special types of minigames that cannot be accessed regularly. Some spaces, specifically "happening" spaces, will incorporate the relevant theme; for example, a giant robot resembling Mecha Bowser will shoot any character back to the start when landing on its "happening" space in the Toy Dream board.

Players can choose to play minigames separate from the board game context via "Minigame Mode". The minigames are categorized by their character structure with "4-player", "1 vs. 3", and "2 vs. 2" available. Besides these standard versions, there are also the "DK" and "Bowser" minigames, which are themed to reflect their titular character; "Battle" minigames are retained from the previous three Mario Party games. "Duel" minigames, which involve 2 players competing against each other, are re-introduced. The set of minigames are available without a structure ("Free play") in this mode, but can be formatted into tournaments and separate objectives like in "Mini-game circuit", involving the characters winning minigames to reach the finish line first. A total of 75 minigames can be played, but they all must be unlocked via "Party mode" and "Story mode" before they can be played in "Minigame Mode". In "Bonus Mode", a set of 3 larger games that do not appear in usual play can be accessed; this involves a card-based board game ("Card party"), as well as Beach volleyball and Ice hockey.

Mario Party 5 introduced the "Super-Duel Mode", a game involving the player assembling and controlling a combat vehicle. Each component of the vehicle can be bought separately; these do not necessarily have to fit with other parts stylistically, and contribute to the vehicle's general statistics regarding fields such as health and speed. Once the vehicle is assembled and named, it can engage AI or human opponents in a single match or in tournaments. Variants of this  are available, including a capture the flag mode and another requiring the player to shoot mechanical rabbits.

The story mode in Mario Party 5 is completely different from the story modes of Mario Party 3 and 4. Players face the Koopa Kid trio (red, green, and blue). The only way to defeat them and clear the board is to take all their coins away, mostly by beating them in minigames. Players must take all coins from a Koopa Kid to defeat him. If players lose all of the coins or don't defeat the Koopa Kids within fifteen turns, the game is over. After players win 5 boards, they face Bowser in a final stage mini-game called "Frightmare", which is a 1-on-1 mini-game with Bowser. There are 4 parts to the battle. First, players go against Mechakoopas (robotic versions of Koopa Troopas). Next, players have to move and jump around to avoid 3 rings of fire for a short time. Then players face Bowser directly; they must make him jump onto a tile 3 times to clear the third part. The final part of the minigame is the final battle, where Bowser grows. After throwing fireballs and hitting Bowser with them 5 times, the game is cleared and the final board is unlocked. Also, just like in Mario Party 3, the new playable characters are unplayable in this mode.

Development
Like its predecessors, Mario Party 5 was published by Nintendo and developed by Hudson Soft. Nintendo first unveiled the game at the E3 conference in 2003, where eight mini-games were available in a playable demonstration. Following release, Nintendo announced Mario Party 5 as a "Player's Choice" title, which is a label for Nintendo titles that had sold more than one million copies to be sold at a bargain price.

Reception

Mario Party 5 received "average" reviews according to the review aggregation website Metacritic.

Game Informers Andrew Reiner cited the example of coin redistribution in the game, which meant that "You could win every minigame and collect the most coins but still end up in last place", when giving a second opinion of the game. While acknowledging issues relating to the waiting times during board games, IGN's Peer Schneider praised this installment for relieving the problem slightly, specifically referring to the Koopa Kids, who all take their turns at the same time in "Story" mode. The quantity and accessibility of the minigames was lauded by GameSpot, although the reviewer Ryan Davis proceeded to note "If you bought Mario Party 4 last year, Mario Party 5 is hard to recommend", noting a lack of change to the series formula. Generally, critics cited having a fun experience in Mario Party 5, although the minigames received a more enthusiastic reaction than the actual board game, with GameSpy commenting that "the sheer volume can keep you compelled. If only you didn't have to deal with all that BS in-between" when referring to gameplay of the actual board game.

Features introduced in the game received a mixed response. The 3 games in "Bonus" mode were praised, although reviewers were least enthusiastic about "Card Party", with GameSpot commenting that "This mode is proof that the minigames are really what make Mario Party fun, as it's pretty dull." The capsule system was generally criticised as the pertaining animations seemed to exacerbate the game's slow pace. Despite other reviewers' claims that the capsule system contributed to the game's dependence on chance, IGN commended the system for contributing to a more dynamic game board experience. The "Super Duel" mode was praised as a reasonably fun feature, although the gameplay was rated as "sluggish". GameSpy noted the seemingly increased board sizes from previous installments, which apparently made obtaining stars and using ranged items more difficult

The game's graphics received a mediocre response, with GameSpot commenting that the presentation is "starting to seem a bit antiquated" when noting that the character models did not seem to have been updated from Mario Party 4. Despite this, IGN commented that Mario Party 5 "isn't a bad looking game", noting the level of detail and variety given to the game's board game's and maps. GameSpot noted that the game's audio did fit the game, although they commented that it "is largely recycled from Mario Party 4". IGN criticized the "cheesy" and unadventurous soundtrack, as well as a lack of voice acting. The game won the Console Children's Award at the 2004 Interactive Achievement Awards.

It sold 807,331 copies in the US.

References

External links
 Japanese official site

2003 video games
GameCube games
GameCube-only games
Interactive Achievement Award winners
Mario Party
Party video games
Video games developed in Japan
Multiplayer and single-player video games

de:Mario Party#Mario Party 5